Coris batuensis, the Batu coris, also known as the Batu rainbow-wrasse, the variegated wrasse, the dapple coris, pallid wrasse, Schroeder's coris, Schroeder's rainbow wrasse, variegated rainbowfish or yellow wrasse, is a species of wrasse native to the Indian Ocean and the western Pacific Ocean from the African coast to the Marshall Islands and from southern Japan to Australia's Great Barrier Reef and Tonga. It can reach  in total length. It is of minor importance to local commercial fisheries and can also be found in the aquarium trade.

References

External links
http://www.marinespecies.org/aphia.php?p=taxdetails&id=218956
 

Fish of Thailand
batuensis
Taxa named by Pieter Bleeker
Fish described in 1856